Katherine Woodville (born Catherine Woodville; 12 March 19385 June 2013) was an English film and television actress. She changed her professional name to Kate Woodville in 1967 upon moving to the U.S., where she eventually became a life member of the Actors Studio.

Career
She was known for her appearances in Z-Cars, The Avengers, Danger Man, Mission: Impossible, It Takes a Thief, Mannix, The Rockford Files, Days of Our Lives and Eight Is Enough. In the original Star Trek series, she played Natira in the episode "For the World Is Hollow and I Have Touched the Sky" (1968). She guest-starred as Nedra in Season 2 Episode 12 of Kung Fu (1974), entitled "The Gunman". She appeared in two episodes of the TV series The Saint and in an episode of Gibbsville in 1976.

Personal life
Woodville married three times: first to Avengers star Patrick Macnee and then to Jerrold Freedman, an American film and television director and novelist.

Her third marriage was to actor Edward Albert (son of Eddie Albert) from 1978 until his death in 2006. The couple had one child, a daughter, singer/songwriter and poet Tai Woodville.

Death
Woodville retired from acting in 1979. She died of cancer on 5 June 2013 at the age of 75. Her ashes were sprinkled off Malibu, California at Point Dume.

Filmography

References

External links
 
 

1938 births
2013 deaths
English film actresses
English television actresses
20th-century English actresses
Actresses from London
Actresses from Portland, Oregon
English emigrants to the United States
Deaths from cancer in Oregon
21st-century American women